Geoffrey Michael Geary (born August 26, 1976) is an American former professional baseball right-handed relief pitcher, who played in Major League Baseball (MLB) for the Philadelphia Phillies and Houston Astros.

Biography
Geary graduated from Grossmont High School in 1994 in El Cajon, CA. He attended San Diego Mesa College and the University of Oklahoma. While at Oklahoma Geary went 4–3 with a 2.20 ERA at Oklahoma and led Big 12 in ERA in 1997.

Professional career

Philadelphia Phillies
Geoff Geary was drafted by Philadelphia Phillies in the 15th round (434th overall) of the  amateur entry draft. He was awarded Red Barons Pitcher of the Year in  after a stellar year in AAA. That year, he primarily filled three roles: as a starter, set-up man and closer, where he reached career-highs in games (46) and saves (5) and fell one win shy of tying his career high (10). He was awarded Phillies Minor League Pitcher of the Month for June 2003. He also was awarded the Greg Legg Tenth Man Award, by the Scranton booster club, given to a player who comes off the bench to consistently contribute to the success of their team. That year, he made his major league debut on August 27, 2003 against the Montreal Expos, allowing one run in his one inning of work. He appeared in only 5 games in 2003.

In , Geary went 7–1 with a 2.96 ERA in 91.1 innings and posted a career best ERA and a team best ERA for pitchers with over 25 innings pitched. He also had the lowest ERA in the National League for relievers with over 80 innings pitched. After making close to the major league minimum from 2003 to 2006, he became eligible for salary arbitration for the first time in the 2006– offseason and was offered $750,000 by the Phillies while he asked for $925,000. Geary agreed to a one-year contract worth $837,500 with the Philadelphia Phillies, avoiding arbitration. Geoff was pitching with the team's AAA affiliate the Ottawa Lynx until July 29, 2007 when the team recalled him after an injury to Ryan Madson.

Houston Astros
On November 7, 2007, Geary was traded to the Houston Astros along with Michael Bourn and Mike Costanzo for Brad Lidge and Eric Bruntlett.  Geary had a career year in 2008 for the Astros with a career-low 2.53 ERA in 64 innings pitched.  However, in 2009, Geary went 1–3 with an 8.10 ERA in 16 appearances before going on the disabled list May 14 with tendinitis in his right biceps.  On June 10, he was activated but placed on waivers and sent outright to Triple-A Round Rock Express. In October 2009 Geary was granted free agency.

Texas Rangers
On December 16, 2009, Geary signed a minor league contract with the Texas Rangers with an invitation to spring training. He played with the Oklahoma City RedHawks, where he appeared in 23 games and had a record of 4-5 with a 5.37 ERA when he was released on July 27, 2010.

Los Angeles Dodgers
On August 8, 2010, he signed a minor league deal with the Los Angeles Dodgers, and was assigned to Triple-A Albuquerque the following day. He appeared in eight games with a 5.06 ERA.

San Diego Padres
On February 16, 2011, he was signed to a minor league deal with the San Diego Padres. He was released on March 26.

After the MLB
After being released from the Padres, Geary signed a contract with the York Revolution of the Atlantic League on June 23, 2011. As of the 2011 Atlantic League All-Star Break (July 11 - July 14), Geary had pitched 8 innings in 8 appearances and had a 4.50 ERA.

References

External links

1976 births
Living people
Albuquerque Isotopes players
American expatriate baseball players in Canada
Baseball players from Buffalo, New York
Batavia Muckdogs players
Clearwater Phillies players
Houston Astros players
Major League Baseball pitchers
Oklahoma City RedHawks players
Ottawa Lynx players
Philadelphia Phillies players
Reading Phillies players
Round Rock Express players
Scranton/Wilkes-Barre Red Barons players
Sportspeople from El Cajon, California
Baseball players from San Diego
York Revolution players
Anchorage Bucs players